The 10th All-Africa Games took place between September 3–18, 2011 in Maputo, Mozambique. Maputo's hosting marked the third time the Games was held in the southern part of the continent.

Host awarding
In April 2005, Lusaka, Zambia was named the host of the 10th Games by the Supreme Council for Sport in Africa at a meeting in Algeria. In 2004, Ghana had indicated an interest in hosting the Games, but reportedly withdrew its bid.

In December 2008, the Zambian government withdrew its offer to host the 2011 Games, due to a lack of funds.

In April 2009, Mozambique stepped in to take on hosting duties.

Participating nations
The following is a list of nations that participated in the 2011 All-Africa Games:

 Libya

 South Sudan

Sports
The Maputo 2011 All Africa Games featured 20 sports, 2 of which also featured disabled events (athletics and swimming). While most venues was located in and around Maputo, the Canoeing venue was in Chidenguella Lagoon, 275 km north of the city.

Calendar
The schedule of the games was as follows. The calendar is to be completed with event finals information.

Medal table
The 2011 All-Africa Games, was a multi-sport event held in Maputo, Mozambique from 3 to 18 September 2011. The event saw 5,000 athletes from 53 National Olympic Committees (NOCs) competing in many events in 20 sports. This medal table ranks the participating NOCs by the number of gold medals won by their athletes.

Medal table 
Below the final medal table after the end of the 2011 All-Africa Games.

Venues and infrastructure
When Mozambique initially announced its ability to host the 10th Games, there was a possibility of a paring down of the sports to be offered, due to time constraints and a potential lack of facilities for the Games (e.g. the country has no field hockey field capable of hosting a Games-level competition). However, the Games eventually featured 20 sports, down 4 from the 24 hosted at the 2007 All-Africa Games.

Listed below are the venues that hosted the 2011 All-African Games:
Universidade Eduardo Mondlane – Handball
Estádio Nacional do Zimpeto – Athletics
Escola Josina Machel – Badminton
Pavilhão do Zimpeto – Basketball
Pavilhão do Estrela Vermelha – Boxing
Chidenguele – Canoeing
Via Pública – Cycling
Estádio Nacional de Zimpeto, Estádio do Costa do Sol, Estádio do Maxaquene, Estádio da Machava – Football
Escola Central da Frelimo – Judo
Universidade Eduardo Mondlane – Karate
Piscina Olimpica de Zimpeto – Swimming
IMAP – Netball
Arena do Costa do Sol – Beach volleyball
Escola Central da Frelimo – Taekwondo
Courts do Zimpeto — Tennis
Centro Mahometano – Table tennis
Bilene – Triathlon
Baía de Maputo – Sailing
Pavilhão do Maxaquene – Volleyball
Banco de Moçambique Matola – Chess

References

External links
 
 All Sports General Schedule 
 Event at Ultraviewdirectory
List of Mozambique athletes at the 2011 All-Africa Games

 
All-Africa Games
All-Africa Games
All-Africa Games
All-Africa Games 2011
Sport in Maputo
Multi-sport events in Mozambique
21st century in Maputo
African Games
September 2011 sports events in Africa